The men's doubles competition of the racquetball events at the 2015 Pan American Games was held from July 19–24 at the Direct Energy Centre (Exhibition Centre), in Toronto, Canada. The defending Pan American Games champion is Álvaro Beltrán and Javier Moreno of the Mexico.

Schedule

All times are Central Standard Time (UTC-6).

Round robin
The round robin will be used as a qualification round. Groups was announced at the technical meeting the day before the competition begins.

Pool A

Pool B

Pool C

Playoffs

References

Racquetball at the 2015 Pan American Games
Racquetball at multi-sport events